Salem Khalifa (born 19 March 1955) is a Saudi Arabian sprinter. He competed in the men's 4 × 100 metres relay at the 1976 Summer Olympics.

References

External links
 

1955 births
Living people
Athletes (track and field) at the 1976 Summer Olympics
Saudi Arabian male sprinters
Olympic athletes of Saudi Arabia
Place of birth missing (living people)
20th-century Saudi Arabian people
21st-century Saudi Arabian people